Paul Rumble (born 14 March 1969) is a former professional footballer who played in the Football League for Maidstone United and Scunthorpe United.

References

1969 births
Living people
Sportspeople from Hemel Hempstead
English footballers
Association football defenders
Watford F.C. players
Scunthorpe United F.C. players
Maidstone United F.C. (1897) players
Hemel Hempstead Town F.C. players
English Football League players